Cherneyevo is a rural locality (a village) in Domshinskoye Rural Settlement, Sheksninsky District, Vologda Oblast, Russia. The population was 311 as of 2002.

Geography 
Cherneyevo is located 33 km southeast of Sheksna (the district's administrative centre) by road. Dyakonitsa is the nearest rural locality.

References 

Rural localities in Sheksninsky District